Kaathal: The Core is an upcoming Indian Malayalam-language drama film directed by Jeo Baby and written by Adarsh Sukumaran and Paulson Skaria, starring  Mammootty in the lead role with Jyothika. The cinematography is handled by Faiz Siddik and the music is composed by Mathews Pulickan.

Principal photography began on 10 July 2022 with a pooja function.

Cast 
Mammootty as Mathew Devassy 
Jyothika

Production 
Mammootty joined the sets of the film. Jyothika joined the set on October 20.

References

External links 
 

Upcoming films
Upcoming Malayalam-language films